AMRC may refer to:
 Academy of Medical Royal Colleges
 Antarctic Meteorological Research Center
 Advanced Medical Research Center, Yokohama
 Amaravati Metro Rail Corporation
 Advanced Manufacturing Research Center, University of Sheffield
 Asian Marble Racing Confederation